Riches, belles, etc.  (also known as Riches, belles et cruelles) is a 1998 French comedy film written and  directed by Bunny Schpoliansky and starring Lola Naymark, Claudia Cardinale and Marisa Berenson.

Plot 

During her rich and famous mother's absence, a little girl, alone in a big hotel, tries to understand what being a woman means by interviewing various women...

Cast 

 Lola Naymark  as Rose
 Claudia Cardinale  as  Baroness Mitsy
 Marisa Berenson  as  Alizéa
 Anouk Aimée  as  la fée
 Sonia Rykiel  as  Hortense
 Gisèle Casadesus as  Rosalinde
 Claire Maurier  as  The tawny woman
  Emilie Brigand as Laëtitia
 Jay Alexander as Jay
  Hermine de Clermont-Tonnerre as Alma
  Tasha Mota e Cunha as Ines
  Alexandra Kamp as la dormeuse
  Bunny Schpoliansky as Lilas
  Maria Cristina Mastrangeli as  la gouvernante
 Firmine Richard as l'embaumeuse
  Isabelle Tanakil as l'Espagnole

References

External links

French comedy films
1998 comedy films
1998 films
1990s French films